Ivan John Henderson (born 7 June 1958) is a Labour Party politician in the United Kingdom. He was the Member of Parliament (MP) for Harwich from 1997 to 2005. He is currently a member of Essex County Council for Harwich.

Early life
Henderson attended the Sir Anthony Deane Comprehensive, now known as the Harwich and Dovercourt High School.

Henderson was previously a Harwich Town Councillor and Tendring District Councillor. He was a stevedore for Harwich International Port. He became a trade union official.

Parliamentary career
When elected in 1997, he was Harwich's first Labour MP.

In Parliament he was a Parliamentary Private Secretary at the Home Office, Office of the Deputy Prime Minister, Department for Work and Pensions and the Treasury. He worked closely with Gordon Brown until he lost his seat to the Conservative Douglas Carswell in the 2005 general election. In the 2010 general election Henderson contested the Clacton constituency, aside from the town of Harwich itself, which contained much of the former constituency of Harwich, however he was unsuccessful.

Ivan Henderson continues to play an active role in local politics, acting as the Labour Party's spokesman for Harwich and Clacton. Recent work includes the Kirby Cross Sports Pavilion, where funding that was obtained by Tendring District Council came about through Henderson's discussions with the Football Association.  When it came to be opened, Ivan managed to secure a visit from Richard Caborn MP. He also successfully campaigned for Trinity House HQ to remain in Harwich, he was later reelected to his former East Ward on the Town and District council.

Post-parliamentary career

Boundary changes saw the old Harwich constituency reconstituted into the new Harwich and North Essex and Clacton constituencies. Henderson was selected to contest the Clacton seat for the 2010 UK General Election. In the election Henderson polled 25% of the vote, putting him more than 12,000 votes behind the incumbent Conservative MP Douglas Carswell.

After this parliamentary setback, Henderson was elected to Tendring District Council in 2011, winning Harwich East ward in his hometown.

In 2013 he was elected as an Essex County Councillor for Harwich unseating the incumbent Conservative Ricky Callender. He was later reelected in 2017. He has since become the leader of the Labour Group on both councils.

In 2021 Henderson became Mayor of Harwich, and said he was extremely "proud" to have done so, saying that now he has been a representative at all levels, he feels that "he has completed the set".

Personal life
From his first marriage, he has one son and a daughter; from his second marriage he has one son. He married Jo'Anne Atkinson on 13 June 1992. His children are Joseph Henderson, Stuart Henderson and Melissa Henderson.

His wife is also a member of Tendring District Council.

References

External links 
 Ivan Henderson's Official website
 Clacton Constituency Labour Party's Website
 They Work For You
 

1958 births
Living people
Members of Essex County Council
Labour Party (UK) MPs for English constituencies
UK MPs 1997–2001
UK MPs 2001–2005
Councillors in Essex